Roosa Koskelo (born 20 August 1991 in Forssa) is a Finnish volleyball player, a member of the German club Allianz MTV Stuttgart.

Sporting achievements

Clubs 
Finland Championship:
  2014, 2015
  2010, 2012, 2013, 2016
  2011
Finland Cup:
  2012, 2014, 2015
Slovenia Cup:
  2017, 2018
MEVZA League:
  2017, 2018
Slovenia Championship:
  2017, 2018
German Championship:
  2019, 2022
  2021
German Cup:
  2022
CEV Cup:
  2022

References

External links
 Stuttgarts-Schoenster-Sport profile
 Volleyball-Bundesliga profile
 Women.Volleybox profile
 EuroVolley.CEV profile
 CEV profile

1991 births
People from Forssa
Living people
Finnish women's volleyball players
Expatriate volleyball players in Slovenia
Expatriate volleyball players in Germany
Finnish expatriate sportspeople in Slovenia
Finnish expatriate sportspeople in Germany